The 2016 China-ASEAN International Youth Football Tournament was the 2nd edition of the China-ASEAN International Youth Football Tournament. The competition began on 21 February and ended on 25 February 2016.

Participants

References

Sport in Guangxi